Arthur Porter may refer to:

Arthur Porter (MP) (died 1559), English politician during the 16th century
Arthur Kingsley Porter (1883–1933), American art historian and medievalist
Arthur Porter (engineer) (1910–2010), British-Canadian engineer and computer pioneer
Arthur Porter (cricketer) (1914–1994), English cricketer
Arthur Porter (historian) (1924–2019), Creole professor and author
W. Arthur Porter (born 1941), American educator and businessman
Arthur Porter (physician) (1956–2015), Canadian physician and former chair of the Security Intelligence Review Committee

Art Porter may refer to:
Art Porter Sr. (1934–1993), American jazz pianist
Art Porter Jr. (1961–1996), American jazz saxophonist and son of Art Porter, Sr.